Provo or Provos may refer to:

In geography

In the United States
 Provo, Kentucky, an unincorporated community
 Provo, South Dakota, an unincorporated community
 Provo Township, Fall River County, South Dakota
 Provo, Utah, a city
 Provo Peak, a mountain within the city limits
 Provo Canyon, Utah
 Provo River, Utah

Elsewhere
 Provo, Livno, a village in Bosnia and Herzegovina
 Provo, Vladimirci, a village in Serbia
 Providenciales, often shortened to Provo locally, an island in the Turks and Caicos Islands

People
 Saint Provos, another name for Saint Probus of Side (died c. 304 AD), a martyr of the Diocletian persecution
 Provo Wallis (1791–1892), British admiral of the fleet
 Dwayne Provo (born 1970), retired Canadian Football League player
 Fred Provo (1922–1999), America National Football League player in 1948

Transportation
 Provo station (Amtrak), Amtrak inter-city rail station
 Provo station (Utah Transit Authority), Utah Transit Authority commuter rail and bus station
 Kia Provo, a 2013 South Korean concept subcompact hatchback

Other uses
 Provo (movement), a Dutch counterculture movement in the mid-1960s
 Provos, informal term for the Provisional Irish Republican Army
 USNS Provo (T-AG-173), a U.S. Navy ship
 Provo College, Provo, Utah
 Provo High School, Provo, Utah
 PROV-O, an OWL2 ontology allowing the mapping of the PROV data model to RDF